Susana Diazayas  (born Susana Arlett Diazayas Jimeno on February 26, 1979 in Toluca, State of Mexico, Mexico) is a Mexican actress. She was participant the pageant of Nuestra Belleza México 2000.

Filmography

Tv Series
Como dice el dicho
La rosa de Guadalupe
Todos Son Ángeles
Después, El Cielo
Decisiones
'Por Amor a mi HijaLos simuladores
'Vecinos

References

External links

1979 births
Living people
Mexican telenovela actresses
Mexican television actresses
Mexican stage actresses
21st-century Mexican actresses
Actresses from the State of Mexico
People from Toluca